The Michigan Mayhem was a minor league professional basketball team based in Muskegon, Michigan that competed in the Continental Basketball Association.  In the CBA's 2004-05 season the Mayhem finished third in the league's Eastern Conference.  The team played its home games at the L.C. Walker Arena.

The team had previously played in nearby Grand Rapids, Michigan where they were known as the Grand Rapids Hoops and Grand Rapids Mackers. The Mayhem roster included two ex-NBA players, Sam Mack, Roy Tarpley,and Joe Hernandez.

Citing a lack of community support, the team announced on June 22, 2006, that it would not return for a third season.

References

Continental Basketball Association teams
Defunct basketball teams in the United States
Sports in Muskegon, Michigan
Basketball teams in Michigan
2006 disestablishments in Michigan
Basketball teams disestablished in 2006